Maximo Manguiat Kalaw (20 May 1891 – 1955) was a Filipino political scientist and novelist. He was the first Filipino head of the Department of Political Science at the University of the Philippines. He argued for Filipino independence from the United States.

He was born in the town of Lipa, Batangas in the Philippines. He was the brother of Teodoro Kalaw. He studied at the University of Washington and Georgetown University. In 1924, he received a PhD from the University of Michigan.

References 

Filipino political scientists
1891 births
1955 deaths
Filipino novelists
17th-century novelists
People from Lipa, Batangas
20th-century political scientists